Takeshirō, Takeshiro or Takeshirou (written:  or ) is a masculine Japanese given name. Notable people with the name include:

, Japanese painter
, Japanese explorer, cartographer, writer, painter, priest and antiquarian
, Japanese government minister

Japanese masculine given names